The men's 110 metres hurdles event at the 1928 Olympic Games took place between July 31 & August 1. Forty-one athletes from 24 nations competed. The maximum number of athletes per nation was 4. The event was won by Sydney Atkinson of South Africa, the nation's first title in the 110 metres hurdles; Atkinson became the first man to win two medals in the event (he had taken silver in 1924). It was only the second time the United States had not won the event; as in 1920, the Americans took silver and bronze.

Background

This was the eighth appearance of the event, which is one of 12 athletics events to have been held at every Summer Olympics. Two finalists from 1924 returned: silver medalist Sydney Atkinson of South Africa and bronze medalist Sten Pettersson of Sweden. Atkinson and the American hurdlers were favored.

Austria, Ireland, Japan, Poland, Portugal, and Romania each made their first appearance in the event. The United States made its eighth appearance, the only nation to have competed in the 110 metres hurdles in each Games to that point.

Competition format

The competition used the three-round basic format introduced in 1908. The first round consisted of nine heats, with between 4 and 6 hurdlers each. The top two hurdlers in each heat advanced to the semifinals. The 18 semifinalists were divided into three semifinals of 6 hurdlers each; the top two hurdlers in each advanced to the 6-man final.

Records

These were the standing world and Olympic records (in seconds) prior to the 1928 Summer Olympics.

George Weightman-Smith set a new world record at 14.6 seconds in the semifinals; that time was not beaten in the final.

Schedule

Results

Round 1

The first two finishers in each heat moved on to the semifinal round.

Heat 1

Heat 2

Heat 3

Heat 4

Heat 5

Heat 6

Heat 7

Heat 8

Heat 9

Semifinals

The first two finishers in each race moved on to the final.

Semifinal 1

Semifinal 2

Semifinal 3

Final

References

Men's 110 metres hurdles
Sprint hurdles at the Olympics
Men's events at the 1928 Summer Olympics